The Annecy Italian Film Festival, founded in 1983 and since then, each year shows the best of contemporary Italian cinema.
The private festival is held annually (usually in October) at the Centre Culturel de Bonlieu, in the town of Annecy, in the middle of France.

The 28th edition took place from 28 September to 5 October 2010. The President of the Jury was Italian film actress Anna Bonaiuto.

Festival

History 
The festival, created in 1983, was a shared initiative of the Cultural Center of Annecy (now Bonlieu Scène Nationale) and the Italian Cultural Institute of Grenoble. The programming is made up of both contemporary and classical movies.
The competition, first organised in 1985, is supervised by a jury of cinema professionals who have met every year in Annecy since then.
In 1988, Sergio Leone was named the jury's president. His premature death in 1989 lead to the creation of the Sergio Leone Award.
During the 90's, many famous filmmakers came to Annecy, such as the Taviani brothers, Francesco Rosi, Ornella Muti and Alberto Lttuada.
In 1997, for its 15th edition, Ettore Scola became honorary president of the festival. The early 2000s were impacted with the presence of Nanni Moretti in 2001. This edition was also the beginning of the collaboration with Lorenzo Mattotti, who has illustrated every festival poster since then.
In addition to the main competition, some programs dedicated to a specific Italian region were created. A competition for Italian documentaries has also been added to the festival's program.
Annecy Cinéma Italien is now the biggest cultural event dedicated to Italian cinema in France.

Programmes
The Annecy Italian Film Festival is organised in various sections:
The Official Selection - The main event of the festival.
Feature Competition - The nine films competing for the Grand Prix. They should be debut or second feature.
Documentary Competition - The eight documentaries competing for the Grand Prix du Documentaire.
Prix Sergio Leone - A selection of the films of director who receives the award for the whole of his work.
Parallel Sections - These are non-competitive programmes dedicated to discovering other aspects of cinema.
Torino - Piemonte Section - A selection of the films filmed in Torino - Piemonte.

Juries
Official Jury - An international jury composed of a President and various film or art personalities, who determine the prizes for the feature films in Competition.
Documentary Jury - An international jury composed of a President and various film or art personalities, who determine the prizes for the documentary films in Competition.
CICAE Jury - An international jury composed of a various film or art personalities, who determine the Pierre Todeschini prize for the feature films in Competition.

Awards
Competition
 Grand Prix - Grand Prize of the Festival
 Prix du Jury - Jury Prize
 Prix d'interprétation féminine - Best Actress
 Prix d'interprétation masculine - Best Actor
 Grand Prix du Documentaire - Grand Prize of the Festival
 Prix du Jury du Documentaire - Jury Prize
 Prix CEZAM du Documentaire - Jury Prize
Other Sections
 Prix Sergio Leone - Award for the whole of work
 Prix du Public – Ville d'Annecy prize - Public prize
Given by Independent Entities
 Prix CICAE - Pierre Todeschini - Professional Jury of Film Prize

External links

Festival du Cinéma Italien d'Annecy 

Film festivals established in 1983
Film festivals in France
1983 establishments in France